K. Ramnoth (1912–1956) was an Indian cinematographer and director active in Tamil cinema.

Career 
Ramnoth was born in 1912 at Pujapura, Trivandrum. After passing his Bachelor degree, he arrived in Chennai in search of a career. He started as an assistant in Kodak. While he was working there, he wrote articles on the subject of photography for various publications. He sent one such article to a publication called Sound and Shadow. This publication was owned jointly by Muthuswami Iyer and A. K. Sekhar (Muthuswami Iyer later directed films under his pen name Murugadasa and A. K. Sekhar became an art director.) The article led Ramnoth to join these two.

A breakthrough came in 1933 when the trio received a letter from V. Shantaram, partner of Prabath Films in Kolapur. Shantaram requested their help in his production of Sita Kalyanam in Tamil. Ramnoth worked as cinematographer and assistant director. His name was shown as K. Ramanathan in the film credits.

The trio then went in charge of the technical department of Vel Studios that was located at Eldams Road in Teynampet. (Later this studio was moved to Guindy). They produced films like Markandeya in 1935 and Pathuga Pattabishekam in 1936.

In one of the films he worked for in 1938, Ramnoth introduced miniature photography for the first time in Tamil films. It was a scene showing a downpour of paddy showering on a parched, famine-stricken land. Viewers were awed to see such a scene.

Due to World War II, some studios had to close down. Ramnoth and A. K. Sekhar went to work for Gemini Studios. They worked in films like Kannamma En Kadhali, Miss Malini and Chandralekha. Both left Gemini some time in 1948–49 and joined Jupiter Pictures who had their office in Central Studios Coimbatore.

While at Jupiters, Ramnoth directed Marmayogi which was a success and brought fame to its lead actor M. G. Ramachandran. It was the first Tamil film to be given an 'A' certificate (adults only) by the CBFC because there was a ghost in the film.

Jupiter was making another film Mohini with Lanka Satyam as its director. A scene had to be shot in which the main actor and actress are seated on a flying horse singing a duet. The producer was not satisfied with the shot. He called Ramnoth to redo the scene, and was impressed with Ramnoth's photography. However, Ramnoth asked the producer to give credit only to Lanka Satyam in the film.

After Jupiter, Ramnoth worked for Pakshiraja Studios and then for Modern Theatres.

Later, in 1954, Ramnoth produced his own film Viduthalai. He suffered financially and mentally due to its failure which led to his death in 1956 at the age of 44.

Filmography

As director 
 Kathanayaki (1955)
 Rihaee (1954)
 Sugam Enge (1954)
 Viduthalai (1954)
 Manithan (1953)
 Thai Ullam (1952)
 Ek Tha Raja (1951)
 Marmayogi (1951)
 Beedala Patlu (1950)
 Ezhai Padum Padu (1950)
 Kanniyin Kaadhali (1949)
 Paduka Pattabhishekham (1936)
 Markandeya (1935)

As cinematographer only 
 Oka Talli Pillalu (1953)
 Kanchana (1952)
 Beedala Patlu (1950)
 Kalpana (1948)
 Chandralekha (1948)
 Mangamma Sapatham (1943)
 Bhakta Potana (1942)
 Devatha (1941)
 Sumangali (1940)
 Vande Mataram (1939)
 Gruhalakshmi (1938)
 Sasirekha Parinayam (1936)
 Seeta Kalyanam (1934)

References 

Film directors from Thiruvananthapuram
Cinematographers from Kerala
1912 births
1956 deaths
Tamil film cinematographers
20th-century Indian film directors
20th-century Indian photographers
Tamil film directors